Swallowfield is an unincorporated community in Franklin County, Kentucky, United States. Its post office  is closed. It was also known as Dottsville.

References

Unincorporated communities in Franklin County, Kentucky
Unincorporated communities in Kentucky